The Cèze is a karstic French river, a right tributary of the Rhône. It runs through the departments of Lozère and Gard in the Occitanie region. Its source is in the Cévennes mountains, near Saint-André-Capcèze. It flows through Bessèges, Saint-Ambroix, Bagnols-sur-Cèze, and it flows into the Rhône at Codolet, southwest of Orange.

Its longest tributaries are the Luech, Auzon, Tave, Ganière and Aiguillon.

In the dry season, the Cèze sometimes dries up.

References

Rivers of France
Rivers of Gard
Rivers of Lozère
Rivers of Occitania (administrative region)